OBG is an initialism for Ormeau Baths Gallery in Belfast, Northern Ireland.

OBG may also refer to:

 OBG/OBGYN, surgical–medical specialties dealing with the female reproductive organs
 OBG(W), Overwatch Battle Group (West), an Australian Army battlegroup
 OBG Ltd v Allan, a case on economic torts in English law
 Odessa Botanical Gardens, Ukraine
 Ofer Brothers Group, an Israeli family business
 Oprah's Big Give, a reality television series hosted by Nate Berkus
 Operation Board Games, a 2003 federal fraud investigation